Kellogg Public Library and Neville Public Museum is located in Green Bay, Wisconsin. The site was added to the National Register of Historic Places on June 9, 1981, for its significance in architecture and social history. It was built in 1901 in the Classical Revival architectural style. In 1983, the County took full control of the museum and moved it across the river to its current location.

References

Government buildings completed in 1901
Library buildings completed in 1901
Libraries on the National Register of Historic Places in Wisconsin
Public libraries in Wisconsin
Museums in Brown County, Wisconsin
Neoclassical architecture in Wisconsin
Buildings and structures in Green Bay, Wisconsin
Carnegie libraries in Wisconsin
National Register of Historic Places in Brown County, Wisconsin